The Kurdish mujahideen were Kurdish Islamists that fought during the 1980s until 2000s against the state of Iraq and the rule of Saddam Hussein.

Formation 
During the Iran–Iraq War, Sheikh Osman Abdulaziz, leader of the IMK, called for an independent Kurdish nation, as well as declaring a holy war against Iraq and against Ba'athism, which led independent Kurdish Islamists, Kurdish Islamist organizations, and even Peshmerga soldiers who had Islamist leanings, to form a type of united front. Many Kurdish Islamists set up training camps in the mountains of Kurdistan, recruited people, and began rebelling against Iraq.

Shortly before the Halabja massacre, Saddam Hussein cracked down on Kurdish Islamic scholars, which led them to flee Halabja and go to Iran, where they had strong support. That was when the Kurdish mujahideen became active in Halabja, which would later become their stronghold. Many Kurds from Halabja concluded that Jihad was the best way to Iraq. The mujahideen received many Kurdish volunteers from Iran.

Activities 
The mujahideen started in 1980 during the Iran-Iraq War, but at the end of the war in 1988, they mostly halted their operations, but maintained a low-level insurgency against Iraq. In the 1991 Iraqi uprisings during the Gulf War, the mujahideen heavily increased their activities, and towards the end of the war, they slowed down again. They had over 10,000 fighters at their peak.

Islamist Kurds and secular Kurds became opponents after the Islamist insurgency in Iraqi Kurdistan, which was the time that Ansar al-Islam, with the help of KJG and IMK fighters, established the Islamic Emirate of Byara. The Islamic Emirate of Byara was defeated after a brief 2 years of existence, and most of the jihadists fled to Iran. The united mujahideen ended after the overthrow of Saddam Hussein, although the groups remained.

Groups 
 IMK; led by Osman Abdulaziz
 KJG; led by Ali Bapir
 KRH; led by Adham Barzani
 KHI; led by Mohammad Khalid Barzani
 Islah (short-lived); led by Mullah Krekar
 Independent Mujahideen; no centralized leadership
 Peshmerga soldiers with Islamist leanings; no centralized leadership
 AAI; led by Mullah Krekar, and later Abu Abdullah al-Shafi'i

See also
Iraqi Kurdish Civil War
KDPI–Komala conflict
Islamist insurgency in Iraqi Kurdistan
Rojava-Islamist conflict
Other mujahideen groups:
 Chechen Mujahideen
 Indian Mujahideen
 Afghan mujahideen
 Bosnian mujahideen

References 

Kurdish Islamists
Kurdish Islamism
Kurdish nationalism
Kurdistan independence movement
Mujahideen
Iran–Iraq War
1980s in Iran
1980s in Iraq
History of the Persian Gulf
Saddam Hussein
Gulf War
Islam in Iraq
Opposition to Arab nationalism